Gonarvand (also Romanized as Gonārvand and Konārvand; also known as Kanarwān, Kenar Vand, Konārvand-e Varkow, and Konārvan-e ‘Olyā) is a village in Shirvan Rural District, in the Central District of Borujerd County, Lorestan Province, Iran. At the 2006 census, its population was 131, in 25 families.

References 

Towns and villages in Borujerd County